Sabandus or Sabandos was a town of ancient Lycia.

Its site is tentatively located near modern Muskar in Asiatic Turkey.

References

Populated places in ancient Lycia
Former populated places in Turkey